Molière Award for Best Supporting Actress.

Superlatives

Winners and nominees
 1987 : Sabine Haudepin in Kean
Anne Alvaro in Tonight We Improvise  (Ce soir on improvise)
Catherine Arditi in Adriana Monti
Lucienne Hamon in Conversations After a Burial (Conversations après un enterrement)
Magali Noël in Cabaret
 1988 : Catherine Salviat in Dialogues of the Carmelites (Dialogues des carmélites)
Pascale de Boysson in Fall (Ce que voit Fox)
Denise Chalem in Double Inconstancy  (La Double Inconstance)
Nicole Jamet in The Secret  (Le Secret)
Nada Strancar in The Winter's Tale  (Le Conte d'hiver)
 1989 : Christine Murillo in The Seagull (La Mouette)
Béatrice Agenin in Une femme sans histoire
Catherine Rich in La Vraie Vie
Martine Sarcey in Une absence
Michèle Simonnet in Just Between Ourselves  (Entre nous soit dit)
 1990 : Judith Magre in Greek
Catherine Frot in Faut pas tuer Maman
Lucienne Hamon in The Passage of Winter  (La Traversée de l'hiver)
Christiane Muller in Les Palmes de Monsieur Schutz
Martine Sarcey in The Passage of Winter  (La Traversée de l'hiver)
 1991 : Catherine Arditi in A croquer... ou l’Ivre de cuisine
Annie Grégorio in Coiffure pour dames
Catherine Rich in The Girl from Maxim's  (La Dame de chez Maxim)
Catherine Rouvel in Eurydice
Maïa Simon in Heldenplatz
 1992 : Danièle Lebrun in Le Misanthrope
Myriam Boyer in Roberto Zucco
Michèle Laroque in Ornifle or It's Later than you Think  (Ornifle)
Catherine Rich in The Girl from Maxim's  (La Dame de chez Maxim)
Marie-France Santon in The Waltz of the Toreadors  (La Valse des toréadors)
 1993 : Françoise Bertin in Temps contre temps
Annick Alane in Enter a Free Man  (Les dimanches de Monsieur Riley)
Nadia Barentin in Monsieur Klebs et Rosalie
Gisèle Casadesus in Le Jugement dernier
Annie Grégorio in Une folie
 1994 : Annick Alane in Fashions for Ladies  (Tailleur pour dames)
Gisèle Casadesus in Le Retour en Touraine
Catherine Rich in Quand elle dansait...
Josiane Stoléru in The Visitor  (Le Visiteur)
Marie Trintignant in The Homecoming  (Le Retour)
 1995 : Catherine Frot in Un air de famille
Sabine Haudepin in Quadrille
Claire Maurier in Un air de famille
Marie-France Santon in Business is business  (Les Affaires sont les affaires)
Michèle Simonnet in La Chambre d'amis
 1996 : Sonia Vollereaux in Lapin lapin
Catherine Arditi in The Diary of a Young Girl  (Le journal d'Anne Frank)
Florence Darel in An Ideal Husband  (Un mari idéal)
Claire Nadeau in Benefactors  (Le bonheur des autres)
Edith Perret in An Ideal Husband  (Un mari idéal)
 1997 : Dominique Blanchar in As Better, Better than Before  (Tout comme il faut)
Elisabeth Commelin in The Libertine  (Le Libertin)
Ginette Garcin in The Man Who Walked Through Walls  (Le Passe-muraille)
Chantal Lauby in La Terrasse
Maïa Simon in Un cœur français
 1998 : Geneviève Casile in Bel-Ami
Isabelle Candelier in André le magnifique
Nathalie Cerda in The Hygiene of the Assassin  (Hygiène de l'assassin)
Michèle Garcia in Funny Money  (Espèces menacées)
Valérie Mairesse in The Surprise of Love  (La Surprise de l'amour)
 1999 : Geneviève Fontanel in A Delicate Balance  (Délicate balance)
Micheline Dax in Frederick or the Crime Boulevard  (Frédérick ou le boulevard du crime)
Chantal Neuwirth in Rêver peut-être
Florence Pernel in A Streetcar Named Desire  (Un Tramway nommé désir)
Frédérique Tirmont in London Assurance  (Le Bel Air de Londres)
 2000 : Dominique Blanchar in The Learned Ladies (Les Femmes savantes)
Catherine Arditi in Between Worlds  (Hôtel des deux mondes)
Geneviève Fontanel in Raisons de famille
Claire Nadeau in Mariages et conséquences
Chantal Neuwirth in Les Nouvelles brèves de comptoir
Beata Nilska in A torts et à raisons
 2001 : Annick Alane in Cat on a Hot Tin Roof  (Une chatte sur un toit brûlant)
Aurore Clément in The Lady of the Camellias  (La Dame aux camélias)
Eliza Maillot in Un homme à la mer
Yasmina Reza in Life X 3  (Trois versions de la vie)
Barbara Schulz in Joyeuses Pâques
 2002 : Annie Grégorio in Théâtre sans animaux
Nadia Barentin in La Griffe (A71)
Denise Chalem in Conversations with my Father  (Conversations avec mon père)
Anne Consigny in Elvire
Claire Nadeau in Le Jardin des apparences
Josiane Stoléru in The Glass Menagerie  (La Ménagerie de verre)
 2003 : Annie Sinigalia in A Song at Twilight  (Poste restante)
Annick Alane in État critique
Anne Consigny in La Preuve
Marina Hands in Phèdre
Eliza Maillot in Un petit jeu sans conséquence
 2004 : Martine Sarcey in L’Inscription
Evelyne Buyle in L'Invité
Guilaine Londez in L'Hiver sous la table
Lysiane Meis in Things We Do for Love  (L'Amour est enfant de salaud)
Dominique Reymond in A Spanish Play  (Une pièce espagnole)
 2005 : Norah Krief in Hedda Gabler
Monique Chaumette in Vigil  (Tantine et moi)
Annie Grégorio in Musée haut, musée bas
Anne Loiret in Jacques a dit
Elisabeth Margoni in Sortie de scène
Lysiane Meis in Jacques a dit
 2006 : Danièle Lebrun in Pygmalion
Béatrice Agenin in Barefoot in the Park  (Pieds nus dans le parc)
Marina Foïs in Viol
Anne Loiret in Broken Glass  (Le Miroir)
Josiane Stoléru in Conversations After a Burial  (Conversations après un enterrement)
Marie Vincent in The Imaginary Invalid  (Le Malade imaginaire)
 2007 : Catherine Hiegel in Return to the Desert  (Le Retour au désert)
Catherine Arditi in Cabaret
Brigitte Catillon in Eva
Marie-France Santon in Lady Windermere's Fan  (L'Éventail de Lady Windermere)
Frédérique Tirmont in Dolores Claiborne
 2008 : Valérie Bonneton in God of Carnage  (Le Dieu du carnage)
Sabine Haudepin in Les Belles-sœurs
Norah Krief in King Lear  (Le Roi Lear)
Bulle Ogier in L'Homme sans but
 2009 : Monique Chaumette in Baby Doll
 Hélène Alexandridis in Madame de Sade
 Christiane Cohendy in Equus
 Annie Mercier in Tartuffe
 Martine Schambacher in La Charrue et les étoiles
 Josiane Stoléru in Cochons d'Inde
 2010 : Claire Nadeau in The Loving Maid (La Serva amorosa)
 Fabienne Chaudat in Colombe
 Julie Pilod in The Cherry Orchard (La Cerisaie)
 Isabelle Sadoyan in Les Fausses Confidences
 Josiane Stoléru in Le Démon de Hannah
 Dominique Valadié in Twelfth Night (La Nuit des rois)
 2011 : Bulle Ogier in Autumn Dream (Rêve d’Automne)
 Valérie Benguigui in Le Prénom
 Brigitte Catillon in Nono
 Dominique Constanza in A Fly in the Ointment (Un fil à la patte)
 Nanou Garcia in Aller chercher demain
 Christiane Millet in Winter Funeral (Funérailles d’hiver)
 2014 : Isabelle Sadoyan in L'Origine du monde
 Marie-Julie Baup in Divina
 Christine Bonnard in La chanson de l'éléphant
 Françoise Fabian in Tartuffe
 Valérie Mairesse in Romeo and Juliet (Roméo et Juliette)
 Bulle Ogier in Les Fausses Confidences
 2015 : Dominique Reymond in Comment vous racontez la partie
 Anne Azoulay in King Kong Théorie
 Léna Bréban in The Other Place (La Maison d'à côté)
 Marie‐Christine Danède in La Colère du Tigre
 Noémie Gantier in Atomised (Les Particules élémentaires)
 Agnès Sourdillon in The Imaginary Invalid (Le malade imaginaire)
 2016 : Anne Bouvier in King Lear (Le Roi Lear)
 Béatrice Agenin in Un certain Charles Spencer Chaplin
 Michèle Garcia in La Dame blanche
 Raphaëline Goupilleau in La Médiation
 2017 : Évelyne Buyle in Les Femmes Savantes
 Ludivine de Chastenet in Politiquement correct
 Anne Loiret in Avant de s'envoler
 Josiane Stoléru in Bella Figura
 Dominique Valadié in Time and the Room  (Le Temps et la chambre)
 Florence Viala in Le Petit-Maître corrigé 
 2018 : Christine Murillo in Tartuffe
 Audrey Bonnet in Actrice
 Isabelle de Botton in Clérambard
 Françoise Lépine in The Graduate (Le Lauréat)
 Élodie Navarre in Le Fils
 Paméla Ravassard in La Dame de chez Maxim

External links
 Official website 

French theatre awards
French awards
Molière
Awards for actresses